Leila Gomes de Barros (born September 30, 1971) is a Brazilian politician and a former volleyball player. She often played as opposite hitter and attacker. She was a member of the Brazilian squad who had great success in the late 1990s and early 2000s (decade), winning the 1996 and 1998 editions of the volleyball Grand Prix and being rated the most valuable player (MVP) in each win.

Volleyball career

Barros started competing in volleyball at the age of fifteen.  She switched to beach volleyball in July 2001, but returned to the indoor courts in 2003 to help the Brazil women's national volleyball team to qualify for the 2004 Summer Olympics in Athens, Greece.

In the Volleyball Women's World Cups, Barros finished as runners-up in 1995 FIVB Volleyball Women's World Cup and 2003 FIVB Volleyball Women's World Cup, won third place in 1999 FIVB Volleyball Women's World Cup.  She also got silver medals in the 1994 World Championships. In the Olympics, her Brazilian team was 3rd in 1996 and 2000. She has also posed in several magazines and was one of the favorite players when she and the Brazilian volleyball team came to the Philippines.

Political career
In October 2018, Barros became the first woman to represent the Federal District of Brazil in the Senate.

References

|-

|-

|-

1971 births
Living people
Members of the Federal Senate (Brazil)
Democratic Labour Party (Brazil) politicians
Brazilian women's volleyball players
Brazilian women's beach volleyball players
Volleyball players at the 1992 Summer Olympics
Volleyball players at the 1996 Summer Olympics
Volleyball players at the 2000 Summer Olympics
Olympic volleyball players of Brazil
Olympic bronze medalists for Brazil
Olympic medalists in volleyball
Sportspeople from Brasília
Medalists at the 2000 Summer Olympics
Medalists at the 1996 Summer Olympics
Pan American Games gold medalists for Brazil
Pan American Games medalists in volleyball
Opposite hitters
Volleyball players at the 1999 Pan American Games
Medalists at the 1999 Pan American Games